A number of units of measurement were used in Syria to measure length, mass, capacity, etc.  The metric system was adopted in 1935 in Syria.

System before metric system

A number of units were used.

Length

One pic was equal to 0.582 m.

Mass

A number of units were used to measure mass.  One rottolo was equal to 1.785 kg.  Some other units were given below:

1 drachme =  rottolo

1 pesi =  rottolo

1 metecali =  rottolo

1  =  rottolo

1 once =  rottolo

1  =  rottolo

1 cola = 35 rottolo

1  = 100 rottolo.

Capacity

Several units were used to measure capacity.  One rotl was equal to 3.2 L.  Some other units are given below:

1  = 250 rotl

1 {{transl|ar|italic=no|garava = 450 rotl.

References

Syrian culture
Syria